Blepharidophyllaceae is a family of liverworts belonging to the order Jungermanniales.

Genera:
 Blepharidophyllum Ångstr.
 Clandarium (Grolle) R.M.Schust.

References

Jungermanniales
Liverwort families